Mira Antonitsch (born 16 December 1998) is an Austrian tennis player.

Antonitsch has won two singles and five doubles titles on the ITF Circuit. On 12 June 2017, she reached her best singles ranking of world No. 507. On 4 November 2019, she peaked at No. 717 in the WTA doubles rankings. Her father, Alex Antonitsch, was also a professional tennis player.

In May 2016, Antonitsch was awarded a wildcard for the main draw of the 2016 Nürnberger Versicherungscup, but lost in the first round to fourth seed and world No. 42, Lesia Tsurenko.

ITF Circuit finals

Singles: 5 (2 titles, 3 runners-up)

Doubles: 7 (5 titles, 2 runners-up)

Fed Cup participation
Antonitsch was nominated to make her Fed Cup debut for Austria in 2019, while the team was competing in the Europe/Africa Zone Group II; their opponents forfeited the match.

Doubles (0–0)

* walkover doesn't count in her overall record.

References

External links
 
 

1998 births
Living people
Tennis players from Vienna
Austrian female tennis players